SV Werder Bremen won its first ever German double, clinching both Bundesliga and the DFB-Pokal. Following a club record-breaking league season, Werder won the title six points clear of Bayern Munich, with Aílton hitting 28 goals, the most ever from a Werder Bremen player. The cup victory was clinched following a 3–2 win against Alemannia Aachen, with defensive midfielder Tim Borowski the unexpected hero, hitting Alemannia with a brace. The title successes were Thomas Schaaf's first in his managerial career. Werder, however, lost both Aílton and defensive senior talisman Mladen Krstajić to FC Schalke 04, since both refused to sign new contracts with the club.

Players

First-team squad
Squad at end of season

Left club during season

Werder Bremen II

Youth team

Bundesliga

League table

DFB-Pokal

Statistics

Topscorers
  Aílton 28
  Ivan Klasnić 13
  Johan Micoud 10
  Nelson Valdez 5

Sources
Results & Fixtures for W Bremen – soccerbase.com

References

Notes

Werder Bremen
2004
German football championship-winning seasons